Cannabis in Luxembourg is decriminalized for recreational use and legalized for medical use. Prosecution depends on the amount of cannabis one possesses. Since 2001, prison penalty has been substituted by a monetary fine ranging from 250 to 2,500 euros.

Decriminalization
In April 2001, Luxembourg updated its prior 1973 law, and reclassified cannabis as a Category B controlled substance, meriting only a fine for a first offense, effectively decriminalizing personal possession.

Legalisation
In November 2018, the government announced that it would legalise the recreational use of cannabis, an exact timetable has yet to be defined. In October 2021, the government announced plans to legalise growing up to four cannabis plants per household for personal use.

Medical cannabis
In November 2017, the Minister of Health announced a two-year pilot program under which Luxembourgers would be able to obtain cannabis extracts and cannabinoids for medical purposes.

In June 2018, lawmakers unanimously approved a bill to legalize the medical use of cannabis.

References

Luxembourg
Drugs in Luxembourg